Gemma Clare Collins (born 31 January 1981) is an English media personality and businesswoman. In 2011, she began appearing on the ITVBe reality series The Only Way Is Essex, appearing until 2019. Collins subsequently went on to appear in numerous television shows, including I'm a Celebrity...Get Me Out of Here! (2014), Celebrity Big Brother (2016), Celebs Go Dating (2018), and Dancing on Ice (2019). In 2018, she began starring in her own reality franchise, Gemma Collins: Diva, and a year later, she began hosting a podcast on BBC Sounds.

Early life
Gemma Clare Collins was born on 31 January 1981 at Oldchurch Hospital in Romford, East London. She is the daughter of Joan (née Williams), who worked as a part-time hairdresser and Alan Collins, the director of Unisystems Freight, an import-export shipping company. She has an older brother named Russell, who is also a director of their father's company. Shortly after her birth, the family moved from a house in Collier Row and Collins was raised in Rise Park where she attended Rise Park Infant School. Collins described her childhood as being "filled with love" and said that although money was "tight", her father still managed to take them on family holidays and said she has "very happy memories" of her early years.

Collins then went on to attend Frances Bardsley Academy for Girls. She enjoyed performing arts from a young age and attended dance lessons and stage school. At the age of 14, she began attending the Sylvia Young Theatre School and successfully auditioned for a part in The Sound of Music. Collins' mother was encouraging and said she knew that her daughter would one day become famous. Collins was bullied at school for being outgoing and confident, and so following the success of her father's business, her parents decided to move her to Raphael Independent School, a private school, for her final year of education. She left school at the age of 16 with a U in GCSE Maths. Reflecting on her time at school, Collins said "I remember sitting in the exam room for my maths GCSE and thinking, "I'm going to be famous, I don't need maths."

After leaving school, Collins got a Saturday job in the clothes shop Warehouse before becoming a waitress at a local pub called The Orange Tree. She signed up to a media studies course at South Essex College but stopped attending after a few weeks as she found it boring. Collins returned to her job at the clothes shop Benetton before spending a few weeks working in a care home, looking after people suffering from mental illnesses. Collins then worked at a recruitment agency in London before becoming a receptionist in a BMW showroom, where she retrained to become a sales executive.

Career

2011–2017: The Only Way Is Essex and Celebrity Big Brother
Collins' first appearance on television was in the ITV documentary Snobs, which aired on 13 January 2000. The series focused on people who believed they were a different class. Following her appearance on the show, Collins visited an agent who told her that she "had charisma but was too fat to be on TV"; suggesting she should lose two stone.

In 2011, Julie Childs, mother of Collins' friend Amy, suggested to producers of the ITV2 reality series The Only Way Is Essex that Collins, who was a used car sales woman at the time, would be an appropriate subject. They went to Collins' house and then filmed her and her friends for two weeks. After going back to work selling cars for a week, she was cast in the programme and began appearing in The Only Way Is Essex from its second series in 2011; her first ever scene was selling a car to Kirk Norcross. Her mother Joan joined in the fifth series in April 2012.

In April 2013, Collins released her debut autobiography Basically...: My Life as a Real Essex Girl, which became a bestseller in its first week of release. In January 2014, Collins took part in the second series of the ITV diving competition Splash!. During training, Collins suffered severe bruising and admitted she had to overcome a fear of water. She became the third celebrity to be eliminated after losing the splash-off to Michaela Strachan in the first heat. In November 2014, she took part in the fourteenth series of I'm a Celebrity...Get Me Out of Here! on ITV. After she refused to parachute into the jungle along with her cast mates, she withdrew after spending 72 hours in the jungle, which she said was due to health issues.

On 5 January 2016, she entered the Celebrity Big Brother house to participate in the seventeenth series. On 2 February 2016, she became the seventh housemate to be evicted, having received the fewest votes to be saved, spending a total of 29 days in the house. In October 2016, Collins appeared on Sky News where she was interviewed by Kay Burley about the campaign to remove the word "Essex girl" from the Oxford English Dictionary. Collins described the definition, which stereotypes Essex girls as "unintelligent, promiscuous, and materialistic", as derogatory and suggested that the meaning be changed. The expression was removed from the dictionary following the successful campaign in December 2020.

In January 2017, Collins took part in the second series of Sugar Free Farm, alongside five other celebrities as they attempted to live on a sugar-free diet. During the show she attempted fishing and despite the strict detox plan, Collins admitted she actually gained weight during the process. In June 2017, Collins returned to Big Brother, as a special guest for a shopping task, alongside fellow ex-contestants Marnie Simpson and Nicola McLean. In October 2017, Collins presented the BBC Radio 1 Teen Award for Best TV Show to Love Island and, after announcing the winner, fell through an opening in the stage. The clip later went viral on social media. In an interview with Irish News, Collins said "the seriousness of it is, it could have been really fatal". After the video's widespread attention, further videos of Collins were used as memes, including scenes from her appearances on The Only Way Is Essex and Celebrity Big Brother.

2018–2021: Dancing on Ice and Diva
In January 2018, Collins appeared on Celebrity 100% Hotter in an attempt to change her style. Collins admitted she was "terrified" about having a makeover but said she was keen to try out some different trends. In February 2018, she took part in the fourth series of Celebs Go Dating. During her time on the show, Collins walked out on one of her dates within the first few minutes after he branded her a "diva" due to her being late, whilst she was also reprimanded by the dating experts after she failed to turn up to her date with Laurence, who was planning to take her to Paris. 

In June 2018, she released her second book, titled The GC: How to Be a Diva, in which she provides advice and self help for women to gain confidence. In an interview on Loose Women, she admitted to using a ghostwriter. She also guest starred in a promotional advert for Netflix's Orange Is the New Black.

Collins went on to appear in Gemma Collins: Diva España, a one-off reality television special aired on 29 August 2018. In September 2018, Collins took part in the thirteenth series of Celebrity MasterChef. She was eliminated in the second round of the third heat after her sea bass served in greaseproof paper failed to impress the judges.

On 24 December 2018, Collins took part in a one-off celebrity special of All Together Now. Collins first performed "Big Spender" by Shirley Bassey where she received a score of 88 after impressing the judges with her vocal ability, which secured her a place in the top 3. She then sang "This Is Me" by Keala Settle and The Greatest Showman ensemble and subsequently finished in third place with a score of 39. 

In 2019, Collins took part in the eleventh series of Dancing on Ice, alongside professional partner Matt Evers. While competing in the series, Collins had an on-screen argument with judge Jason Gardiner, who made comments about her weight and lack of commitment to the series. In week four, Collins suffered a fall during a live performance. She fell on her face, nearly breaking her jaw and neck, and injured her knee significantly. Despite the fall, the couple received their highest scores of the competition and subsequently progressed to the next week. In week six, they became the fifth couple to be eliminated, following a skate-off against Ryan Sidebottom and his professional partner Brandee Malto.

In April 2019, Collins began filming for her own reality series, Gemma Collins: Diva Forever. The series premiered on 7 August 2019 on ITVBe. The pilot episode premiered to a total of 673,038 viewers, and was the most watched episode on ITVBe in that week. Diva Forever was subsequently renewed by ITV for a second series, but due to the COVID-19 pandemic, production was suspended. As a result, Collins filmed a new reality series, Gemma Collins: Diva on Lockdown, from her home in Brentwood. In August 2019, Collins began hosting a podcast on BBC Sounds, titled The Gemma Collins Podcast.

In August 2020, Collins began hosting a second podcast on BBC Sounds entitled The Gemma Collins Love Lounge. In October 2020, Gemma Collins: Diva Forever & Ever premiered on ITVBe.

On 11 December 2020, Collins released a charity single, a cover of "Baby, It's Cold Outside" alongside her Celebrity Big Brother co-star Darren Day, with proceeds from the single going towards Rethink Mental Illness. The music video was released at the end of Gemma Collins: Diva for Xmas, which aired on 9 December 2020. In February 2021, Collins appeared on Piers Morgan's Life Stories, where she discussed her early life, career, relationships, and miscarriages, as well as her struggles with her weight and online trolling. Collins also appeared as a special guest on the second series of RuPaul's Drag Race UK to judge the Snatch Game segment of the show.

In December 2021, Collins appeared on the Christmas Special episode of The Weakest Link. She was voted off in the second round after incorrectly answering a question about the number of beds in a twin room. Collins also returned to Celebrity MasterChef to compete in the Christmas Cook-Off episode, along with other former contestants Joe Swash, Les Dennis, Mica Paris and Rev. Richard Coles. Collins first cooked a sticky figgy pudding in which she mistook cranberries for chillies, but was praised for her second dishes of smoked mackerel pâté and festive gnocchi. She did not win the episode, however judge Gregg Wallace described her mushroom, chestnut and brandy sauce as "magnificent".

2022–present: Self-Harm & Me, The GC's Big Night Out and Chicago

In February 2022, Collins fronted a documentary on Channel 4 titled Gemma Collins: Self-Harm & Me. The documentary followed Collins as she opened up for the first time about her personal relationship with self-harm and saw her speak to experts as they investigated what was behind the rise in cases of self-harm in the United Kingdom. It received positive reviews and Collins was accredited for raising the subject of self-harm and for showing audiences a different side to her. It was subsequently nominated within the Authored Documentary category at the 27th National Television Awards. Collins said she was "blown away" by the nomination, reflecting that "it was the scariest thing to be so honest with [herself], however the response [she] got from the show was totally overwhelming.

In April 2022, Collins embarked on her first live theatre tour, titled The GC's Big Night Out. Performing in venues across the UK, the seven-date tour was announced on 19 April 2021 and tickets went on sale on 23 April. The tour was originally scheduled to take place between 15–24 October 2021 but was postponed due to logistical issues surrounding the COVID-19 pandemic. The tour began in Manchester on 5 April 2022 and Collins was joined by Stephen Bailey who assumed the role of presenter. The show featured Collins singing, looking back at her life and career and being interviewed by Bailey before taking questions from the audience. She performed in Glasgow, Southampton, London, Birmingham and Cardiff before the tour concluded in Newcastle on 14 April.

In May 2022, Collins was set to take over the role of Matron "Mama" Morton in the UK tour of the musical Chicago. Following the announcement of her casting in March, producer David Ian said "[They] were completely stunned by [Collins'] audition for the role" describing her as "an undeniable force both on and off stage" and that "audiences across the country [were] in for a treat." Collins received criticism from several actors and theatre fans on social media who described her as a "stunt casting". Responding to critics, Collins said she "auditioned for the role and trained really hard" adding that she "didn't just get it because of [her alter ego] the GC". She was scheduled to make her debut in the musical at the Sunderland Empire Theatre on 31 May and was due to perform in Cardiff, Blackpool, Sheffield, Norwich and Oxford on selected dates throughout June and July. However a week before, it was announced that Collins had been forced to withdraw from the production due to a flare up of her knee injury that she sustained whilst competing on Dancing on Ice. She was replaced by singer and Loose Women panellist Brenda Edwards.

In June 2022, Collins appeared in an online segment for the BBC nature series Springwatch. She visited Wild Ken Hill in Norfolk and was accompanied by Chris Packham and Hannah Stitfall, where she discussed her love of plants and wildlife and was advised on how to improve her garden before being given a tour around the site. Collins said she was "honoured" to appear on the show and that she had been overwhelmed by the "beauty of nature". In August 2022, Collins appeared on The Big Breakfast, in a guest segment that featured her assuming the role of an agony aunt and answering viewers' questions. In September, Collins appeared as a guest on the show and was interviewed by Judi Love in the bedroom about her self-confidence, upcoming nuptials as well as dispelling rumours she was set to present the next series of Love Island following an online campaign.

Business ventures

Clothing and cosmetics
In July 2012, Collins launched her debut plus-size clothing collection online, ranging from sizes 16 to 22. Collins drew on her own experiences of struggling to find flattering and fashionable clothing in larger sizes and said she was "so happy to be able to offer bigger girls a clothing range that they can show their curves off in." In December 2012, Collins attended the Clothes Show Live at the National Exhibition Centre in Birmingham where she had her own stall featuring pieces from her collection that consumers could purchase. She returned to the exhibition the following year and won the award for "Best Designer" at the British Plus Size Awards in 2013. She also teamed up with fashion brand Simply Be to launch her own collection which included a range of bright prints, dresses and jackets. Collins also opened the branches of the store at Highcross Leicester and MetroCentre in Gateshead, cutting the ribbon at the respective launch parties. A year later, she opened her own clothing boutique in Brentwood, Gemma Collins Clothing. Collins opened a second boutique, Gemma Collins Boutique in November 2014. In April 2015, Collins launched her fashion range with women's clothing retailer Evans.

In November 2017, Collins collaborated with fashion website Boohoo.com to release a clothing range aimed at plus-sized women. The following year, she went on to release a collection of swimwear with the retailer.

In September 2019, Collins released her debut perfume, Diva Pink. The unisex fragrance has a guaiac wood, saffron, rose and sandalwood scent, and is described as a "sensual fragrance with luxury oud and diva day undertones". Collins has also launched two lipsticks, "Candy" and "Diva" as well as her own range of false eyelashes.

In March 2020, Collins announced her collaboration with fashion company InTheStyle, to release a collection of T-shirts, sweaters, hoodies and pyjamas featuring her viral quotes and memes. Following the success of the range, Collins collaborated with the company again in September, debuting her first plus-size collection with the brand which featured dresses, blouses and a selection of loungewear. During the COVID-19 pandemic, Collins released her own range of hand sanitizers and face masks.

In March 2021, Collins teamed up with The London Aesthetics Company to release GemmaCollagen, her own anti-ageing collagen supplement and skincare regime. Collins, who is regularly complimented on her skin, worked alongside the company's director Amrit Bhandal to create an ultimate skincare collection which included a cleanser, a toner, a day cream and a facial mask, as well as an eye serum and an amino acid night repair serum. The company also created a marine collagen supplement that included 90 capsules and was said to positively benefit the skin, hair, joints and muscles. The capsules were included in Grazia magazine's Top 10 "Best Collagen Supplements.

In May 2022, fashion retailer New Look posted a short clip on social media of a blonde woman walking down a corridor, with the caption "Our New Look family just gained a new member! Can you guess who it is?". Two days later, it was revealed to be Collins, who signed a deal worth over £1 million to collaborate with the company on a range of clothing. The exclusive collection designed by Collins herself, included bikinis, tops, dresses and jumpsuits available in sizes 8 to 28 that were inspired by "glamorous locations around the world" and also featured a range of jewellery, shoes and accessories. The collection launched online on 16 May, with Collins hosting a launch party in London that evening. It became available in stores three days later and Collins visited the Liverpool One branch where she held auditions for the public to show off their "modelling moves" in hope of being part of the company's autumn/winter campaign. In June 2022, she collaborated with the hair care brand Aussie to promote their "Deeep Moisture" range. Collins, a consumer of the product herself said that the conditioner had "come to the rescue" after her previous desire to be the "blondest person on the earth" had left her with "dry, damaged locks".

Products and endorsements
In May 2019, Collins teamed up with Just Eat to appear in an online advert where she tried the new chicken fries from Burger King to promote the latest addition to their menu, that were available on the food delivery service.

In April 2020, Collins collaborated with the company Cocoa Plus to release her own range of chocolate bars. She has since released other confectionery including luxury truffles, an advent calendar, and an Easter egg. In July 2020, Collins became the face of low-cost airline Wizz Air. Upon being appointed brand ambassador, Collins said "Anyone who knows me knows I am all about holidays, so Wizz have come to the right person for some travel inspo! Whether it's siestas and fiestas in Marbs or sunbathing and dancing through the night on a Greek Island, I have got a tip or two up my sleeve. Now we can all fly like the GC!". In October, Collins collaborated with Zymurgorium, a distillery in Manchester, to launch her own premium gin liqueur as part of the company's "FlaGINgo" range. In November 2020, Collins partnered with the online casino PlayOJO to launch a faux fragrance, in order to raise awareness that problem gambling is the "addiction with no smell". She admitted that the campaign was close to her heart having previously been around addicts in her life.

In July 2021, Collins teamed up with Durex alongside Ollie Locke and Alix Fox to create the Roadmap to Sexual Satisfaction, a guide in which she provided her tips and advice for getting physical, saying that "Confidence [was] the key to positive, satisfying, intimacy" and that "sexiness comes from within". In May 2022, Collins announced she was working with the brand again to support the launch of their new range of sex toys. She promoted three different vibrators and expressed the importance of "self-love" adding that the use of sex toys was "empowering" and that she wanted to help break the taboo around talking about them. 

In August 2021, Collins was announced as the new face of the laundry detergent brand Surf and released her own limited edition detergent and capsules as part of the company's "Diva Divine" range, exclusive to Asda supermarkets. In October 2021, Collins became a speaker at Big Business Events, a business development service in which she offered her tips for business growth and shared her own experiences during a 3-day live event. In November 2021, Collins announced her collaboration with Amazon Handmade, in which she worked with interior designers Paul Moneypenny and Siobhan Murphy to create a bespoke 33-piece collection featuring homeware, skincare and other gift items, titled the Gemma Collins & Friends Christmas Collection. In December 2021, Collins took part in a debate at the Oxford Union which was part of an advertising campaign for Sainsbury's. She argued that modern and alternative dishes should be served on Christmas Day as opposed to traditional Christmas food and stated that younger generations such as Gen Z would prefer unconventional dishes, endorsing the supermarket's festive food selection. Collins won the debate and said she "had a brilliant time debating at the Oxford Union, it was an absolute dream come true for me", adding that "We should embrace the newness, new taste, new traditions." On 8 and 9 December, Collins took part in "On Trend", a shopping experience broadcast live on TikTok. As part of the two-day event, Collins featured alongside influencers and content creators to promote products that viewers could purchase.

In May 2022, Collins announced her collaboration with snack food manufacturer Walkers as part of their "Crisp In or Crisp Out" campaign. Collins featured in an advert alongside Ed Balls, Nigella Lawson, Gordon Ramsay and Fred Sirieix with Collins and Lawson arguing to "keep crisps in" sandwiches. On 19 June, Collins visited the town of Sandwich in Kent where she debated against Sirieix, who was canvassing to "keep crisps out". The residents of Sandwich then cast their votes on whether crisps should be kept in or out, with the majority choosing the former, resulting in Collins winning the debate and being crowned "President of Sandwich".

In July 2022, Collins collaborated with the freemium online board and card game Bingo Blitz. As part of the collaboration, she was set a week of challenges to promote the game which consisted of Collins explaining her morning routine, performing a jazzercise dance to Meghan Trainor's "All About That Game", visiting Leicester Square to distribute Bingo Blitz merchandise, answering trivia questions and delivering a motivational closing speech to her fans, who had the opportunity to win £1,000 towards a night out by entering a giveaway.

Public image

Alter ego
During her time on The Only Way Is Essex, Collins earned a reputation for being a diva. Her alter-ego was first created during the show's third series when Sam Faiers referred to her as "The GC". Collins describes her alter-ego as an "intervention" and says she and The GC are "very different people". Speaking in 2020, she said "Although I'm Gemma Collins, I've got my brand the GC. Gemma Collins is a homely girl who loves watering hanging baskets.
The GC, which is my brand, is basically a character that's over the top that people either love her or hate her, but on the back of her I've managed to launch perfumes and lipsticks." Collins embraces the term "diva" and says the word "empowers her". Her influences include Marilyn Monroe, Madonna, Beyoncé, Mariah Carey and Dolly Parton.

Humanitarian work
Collins is a supporter of animal rights. She has appeared in numerous campaigns for the animal rights organisation PETA. In 2013, she posed naked for the "I'd Rather Go Naked Than Wear Fur" campaign. In 2020, Collins was photographed in a bathtub to highlight the fact that marine animals are separated from their families and confined to concrete tanks. In 2021, she posed with a skinned fox as she backed the campaign to end the fur trade in the United Kingdom. Addressing the prime minister Boris Johnson, Collins said "Take it from an icon, Boris – no one needs fur in their wardrobe. Do the right thing – ban fur imports and sales. Let's wear our skin and let the animals keep theirs." Speaking on her podcast, Collins expressed her interest in becoming a humanitarian and said she wishes to promote conservation and animal welfare to the next generation.

Media presence
Collins has been a subject of press and tabloid attention since she first began appearing on The Only Way Is Essex in 2011. Her battle with her weight is something that has been widely documented throughout her career, however she has been consistently praised for her confidence, and has promoted body positivity and encouraged women to love themselves no matter their size.

Collins has a large following on social media, having amassed over 2 million followers on Instagram and over 1 million on Twitter. Such is her popularity, she is often paid to promote products and businesses on her pages and can earn up to £75,000 in one day from social media posts. Collins has stated that she only endorses products that she believes in.

Collins is widely known for her diva meltdowns and recognisable catchphrases during her appearances on television and in the media, and as a result became the subject of numerous internet memes. She was branded the "meme queen" by the BBC whilst Peter Robinson of The Guardian described her as a "social media powerhouse who has literally made a meme out of mispronouncing the word meme".

Collins is a staple of "hun culture". Her popularity within the LGBT community has seen her make various appearances at nightclubs and events including G-A-Y and Glitterbomb. She is the most frequently impersonated celebrity on the Snatch Game on RuPaul's Drag Race UK, having been portrayed by Cheryl Hole and Kitty Scott-Claus in the first and third series respectively.

Collins has gone viral on social media several times. On one such occasion in July 2017, she attended the ITV Summer Party wearing an outfit designed by Gerda Truubon. The orange ruched dress with gold chain detailing gained attention due to the distinctive large shoulder pads. Several memes and comparisons were made, with comedian Alan Carr later dressing up as Collins for Jonathan Ross' Halloween party. She also gained notoriety for her falls at the BBC Radio 1 Teen Awards and on Dancing on Ice, the former of which was included in the "Fall of Shame" segment on The Wendy Williams Show in America. In September 2020, Collins was nominated for the Nobel Peace Prize by online pranksters Josh Pieters and Archie Manners. In a letter to the Norwegian Nobel Institute, they cited Collins falling through the stage as an "act of unification" for the nation, and claimed that the "GC effect" could bring peace to North Korea. Following the successful nomination, Collins said she was "surprised and overwhelmed", and although she "couldn't see why someone would want to nominate [her]", she added that she was "all about world peace […] love conquers all. Peace is everything".

Personal life
Collins lives in Roxwell, Chelmsford in a barn conversion which she bought for £1.35 million in 2021. She has described the house as her "dream home" and has had multiple renovations including a swimming pool and a summer house. Collins enjoys gardening and has expressed her love of plants. Collins is passionate about animals and nature. She has several life-size animal sculptures inside her home and in her garden, including a horse with a disco ball, a giraffe lamp, as well as a wooden Asian mother elephant and its calf, the former of which she donated £22,000 to CoExistence, an environmental art campaign conceptualised by the Elephant Family.

Relationships
In 2012, Collins dated fellow The Only Way Is Essex cast member Charlie King. During their relationship, Collins had suspicions that King was gay. He later came out in 2014. Following their split, she began a relationship with mechanic Rami Hawash, whom she had previously dated in 2011; and the pair became engaged on 25 December 2013, however the engagement was called off a few weeks later. In November 2014, Collins was assaulted by her then boyfriend Alexander Moss at her former home in Warley. Reflecting on the incident in 2017, Collins said her biggest regret was not pressing charges because she was "too scared to see it through." Collins briefly dated James Argent in 2012, before reuniting with ex-boyfriend Rami. The pair reconciled in December 2017 when Argent professed his love for Collins during The Only Way Is Essexmas and they were in an on-and-off relationship until July 2020. Argent struggled with cocaine addiction which resulted in the breakdown of their relationship. Collins said Argent's addiction made her feel "suicidal" and caused her to suffer from post-traumatic stress disorder as a result.

In July 2021, Collins confirmed she had rekindled her relationship with ex-fiancé Rami Hawash several months previously after she was spotted wearing her engagement ring in April. They reconnected again after meeting at a Madonna concert. During an interview with The Times in December 2021, Collins announced that the pair were engaged for the second time. She also discussed her plans to have a baby with Hawash as well as a television show to document the pregnancy and baby's birth. Collins also acts as a stepmother to Hawash's son Tristan (born 2018).

Health

Collins began self-harming as a teenager and did so until her early thirties. The first time she engaged in self-harm was at the age of 13 when she picked up a knife and cut her hand in front of her parents. In 2004, Collins had an abortion when she was around three months pregnant after doctors told her that her baby would most likely be born with complications. Following this, the relationship with her boyfriend began to break down and Collins recalls an incident where she slashed her hand open with a kitchen knife to deal with the pain of "grieving for [her] baby and [her] relationship". She also suffered from anxiety attacks and began binge-eating. Collins suffers from polycystic ovary syndrome and in January 2012, she suffered a miscarriage and gave birth to a four and a half month old foetus on her landing the day before she attended the 17th National Television Awards. In July 2020, Collins suffered a third miscarriage, which she initially suspected to be a heavy period, after which she wrote an open letter to Meghan, Duchess of Sussex detailing her struggles with infertility and thanking her for her "bravery and honesty" for opening up about her own miscarriage. Collins previously admitted her fear about never becoming a mother but has said she "won't give up hope" and hopes to conceive naturally one day.

In 2015, Collins underwent surgery to have a designer vagina which cost £2,000. In 2020, she announced that she was planning to have a breast reduction. In 2021, Collins had her botox and fillers removed, stating that she "didn't look like herself" and wanted to instead opt for a more natural look.

During her appearance on Dancing on Ice in 2019, Collins lost over two stone and since then has continued to lose weight after adapting a more balanced diet and exercise regime. She regularly posts workout videos and has shared her fitness journey on social media.

Filmography

Guest appearances
 Snobs (13 January 2000) – 1 episode
 Loose Women (16 September 2011, 1 March 2012, 26 April 2013, 3 October 2013, 24 February 2014, 4 February 2016, 4 March 2016, 3 March 2017, 6 April 2017, 7 September 2017, 2 March 2018, 27 June 2018, 11 February 2019, 20 February 2019, 19 March 2019, 6 August 2020) – 16 episodes
 I'm a Celebrity...Get Me Out of Here! NOW! (23–25 November 2011, 16 November 2015) – 4 episodes
 Peter Andre: My Life (14 December 2011) – 1 episode
 That Sunday Night Show (8 January 2012) – 1 episode
 Celebrity Juice (15 March 2012, 9 May 2013, 11 April 2019, 24 October 2019, 12 November 2020) – 5 episodes
 This Morning (30 March 2012, 2 April 2012, 4 April 2012, 31 August 2012, 19 September 2012, 18 January 2013, 5 April 2013, 19 April 2013, 24 April 2013, 28 November 2014, 3 December 2014, 4 December 2014, 13 May 2015, 5 February 2016, 4 July 2016, 2 August 2016, 30 April 2018, 1 October 2018, 7 January 2019, 23 January 2019, 4 February 2019, 11 February 2019, 14 August 2019, 18 December 2019) – 24 episodes
 The Big Quiz (15 April 2012) – 1 episode
 8 Out of 10 Cats (15 June 2012, 25 January 2013, 28 January 2020) – 3 episodes
 Big Brother's Bit on the Side (4 July 2012, 28 July 2013, 13 May 2015, 16 June 2017) – 4 episodes
 Let's Do Lunch with Gino & Mel (29 August 2012) – 1 episode
 Celebrity Big Brother's Bit on the Side (6 September 2012, 9 January 2013, 1 September 2013, 19 August 2014, 29 January 2015, 2 February 2016, 4–5 February 2016, 1 August 2017) – 9 episodes
 Fake Reaction (3 January 2013) – 1 episode
 8 Out of 10 Cats Does Deal or No Deal (4 January 2013) – 1 episode
 Food Glorious Food (24 April 2013) – 1 episode
 Sunday Side Up (29 December 2013) – 1 episode
 Who's Doing the Dishes? (3 October 2014) – 1 episode
 Phillip's Live 24-Hour TV Marathon (1 December 2014) – 1 episode
 Mel & Sue (14 January 2015) – 1 episode
 If Katie Hopkins Ruled the World (6 August 2015) – 1 episode
 Kendra on Top (21 August 2015) – 1 episode
 Keep It in the Family (22 August 2015) – 1 episode
 Safeword (27 August 2015) – 1 episode
 Tina Malone: My New Body (1 October 2015) – 1 episode
 Tricked (27 October 2015) – 1 episode
 The Wright Stuff (4 February 2016) – 1 episode
 Virtually Famous (8 March 2016) – 1 episode
 In Therapy (5 July 2016) – 1 episode
 It's Not Me, It's You (29 July 2016) – 1 episode
 Alan Carr's Specstacular (31 December 2016) – 1 episode
 Through the Keyhole (4 February 2017) – 1 episode
 BBC Radio 1 Teen Awards (22 October 2017, 21 October 2018)
 Celebrity 100% Hotter (25 January 2018) – 1 episode
 The Generation Game (1 April 2018) – 1 episode
 Livin' with Lucy (10 September 2018) – 1 episode
 ReFreshers Week Presented By Strongbow (1 October 2018) – 1 episode
 Your Face or Mine? (3 October 2018) – 1 episode
 Good Morning Britain (30 October 2018, 19 December 2018, 4 February 2019, 1 April 2019, 24 June 2019, 7 August 2019, 13 November 2019, 25 November 2019, 8 December 2020) – 9 episodes
 I'll Get This (4 December 2018) – 1 episode
 Lorraine (4 January 2019, 18 January 2019, 23 January 2019, 8 March 2019, 9 September 2019, 30 September 2019, 15 November 2019) – 7 episodes
 The Jonathan Ross Show (9 March 2019) – 1 episode
 The Real Housewives of Cheshire (22 April 2019, 11 November 2019) – 2 episodes
 The Crystal Maze (21 June 2019) – 1 episode
 Celebrity Catchphrase (31 August 2019) – 1 episode
 MTV Cribs UK (16 September 2019, 7 December 2020) – 2 episodes
 Dancing on Ice at Christmas (22 December 2019) – 1 episode
 The Big Narstie Show (7 February 2020) – 1 episode
 Inside Missguided: Made in Manchester (12 August 2020) – 1 episode
 Rolling In It (15 August 2020) – 1 episode
 Shopping with Keith Lemon (25 October 2020) – 1 episode
 Celebrity Supply Teacher (17 November 2020) – 1 episode
 The Wheel (19 December 2020, 18 December 2021) – 2 episodes
 Dancing on Ice (24 January 2021) – 1 episode
 Piers Morgan's Life Stories (11 February 2021) – 1 episode
 RuPaul's Drag Race UK (18 February 2021) – 1 episode
 Mel Giedroyc: Unforgivable (23 February 2021) – 1 episode
 Sophie Ellis-Bextor's Kitchen Disco Danceathon (16 November 2021) – 1 episode
 Angela Scanlon's Ask Me Anything (27 November 2021) – 1 episode
 The Weakest Link (23 December 2021) – 1 episode
 Celebrity MasterChef: Christmas Cook-Off (23 December 2021) – 1 episode
 The Travel Show (4 February 2022) – 1 episode
 Springwatch (8 June 2022) – 1 episode
 The Big Breakfast (20 August 2022, 27 August 2022, 3 September 2022) – 3 episodes

Awards and nominations

National Reality Television Awards

British Plus Size Awards

National Television Awards

Podcasts
 The Gemma Collins Podcast (BBC Sounds, 2019)
 The Gemma Collins Love Lounge (BBC Sounds, 2020)

Bibliography
 Basically...: My Life as a Real Essex Girl (2013)
 The GC: How to Be a Diva (2018)

References

External links
 
 Gemma Collins on Instagram

1981 births
Alumni of the Sylvia Young Theatre School
Big Brother (British TV series) contestants
English businesspeople
English television personalities
English podcasters
I'm a Celebrity...Get Me Out of Here! (British TV series) participants
Living people
People from Romford
Television personalities from Essex